The Black Market (Spanish:Mercado negro) is a 1953 Argentine crime film directed by Kurt Land and starring Olga Zubarry, Santiago Gómez Cou and Mario Passano. The film's sets were designed by Carlos T. Dowling. A policeman discovers that his girlfriend's father heads a drug smuggling outfit.

Cast
 Olga Zubarry as Laura 
 Santiago Gómez Cou as Inspector Alfredo Herrera
 Fausto Padín as Camionero 
 Eduardo de Labar as Don Ramón 
 Mario Passano 
 Nelly Panizza
 Luis Otero   
 José De Angelis   
 Miguel Ligero   
 Félix Rivero   
 José María Pedroza   
 Mario Lozano   
 César Fiaschi   
 Carlos Cotto  
 Fernando Labat   
 Carlos Fioriti    
 Antonio Capuano    
 Perla Molina    
 Luis Mora  
 Salvador Sinai   
 Tito Perlat   
 Oscar Llompart  
 Alfredo Almanza  
 Carlos Guisone   
 Horacio de Bello
 Jorge Arias    
 Arsenio Perdiguero  
 Elena Cruz    
 Alberto Barcel 
 Alberto Bello    
 Amalia Bernabé

References

Bibliography
 Elena, Alberto & Lopez, Marina Diaz. The Cinema of Latin America. Columbia University Press, 2013.

External links
 

1953 films
1953 crime films
Argentine crime films
1950s Spanish-language films
Argentine black-and-white films
Films directed by Kurt Land
1950s Argentine films